Thérèse Blondeau (December 4, 1913 – June 28, 2013) was a French swimmer who competed at the 1936 Summer Olympics in Berlin. She failed to advance beyond the first round of the women's 100 metre backstroke event. She had swum previously at the 1934 European Aquatics Championships in Magdeburg, Germany and was one of the last two surviving French participants at the 1936 Summer Olympics, along with Noël Vandernotte. She was born in Épinal.

References

1913 births
2013 deaths
Sportspeople from Épinal
Olympic swimmers of France
Swimmers at the 1936 Summer Olympics
French female backstroke swimmers
20th-century French women
21st-century French women